Kugarchi (Kügärsen) is a rural locality (a selo) and the administrative centre of Kugarchinsky Selsoviet, Kugarchinsky District, Bashkortostan, Russia. The population was 787 as of 2010. There are 5 streets.

Geography 
Kugarchi is located 43 km south of Mrakovo (the district's administrative centre) by road. Semirechye is the nearest rural locality.

References 

Rural localities in Kugarchinsky District